Andrew Hutchinson is a male British former wrestler.

Wrestling career
Hutchinson represented England and won a silver medal in the 52 kg flyweight, at the 1994 Commonwealth Games.

References

Living people
British male sport wrestlers
Commonwealth Games medallists in wrestling
Commonwealth Games silver medallists for England
Wrestlers at the 1994 Commonwealth Games
Year of birth missing (living people)
Medallists at the 1994 Commonwealth Games